The 1946–47 Scottish League Cup was the inaugural staging of Scotland's second most prestigious football knockout competition. The competition was won by Rangers, who defeated Aberdeen 4–0 in the Final.

The tournament became an annual competition in the Scottish football calendar with the return of regular football following the Second World War. The previous season, the unofficial 1945–46 Southern League Cup had been contested by teams across the country and proved popular; the final (also between Aberdeen and Rangers) attracted a crowd of crowd of 135,000 at Hampden Park). It was thus continued on those lines on an official basis from then on.

First round

Section 1

Section 2

Section 3

Section 4

Section 5

Section 6

Section 7

Section 8

Quarter-finals

First leg

Second leg

Aberdeen won 4–2 on aggregate

Rangers won 3–2 on aggregate

Heart of Midlothian won 5–3 on aggregate

Hibernian won 5–4 on aggregate

Semi-finals

Final

References

External links

Scottish League Cup seasons
League Cup